The Kudzu DG-3 is a sports prototype race car, designed, developed and built to World SportsCar (WSC) regulations, by American racing driver Jim Downing; which debuted at Road America in 1993. It competed in sports car racing between 1993 and 2000; achieving 3 podium finishes, and clinched 1 pole position. It was powered by a naturally-aspirated  Mazda 13G wankel 3-rotor, or later, a Mazda 13B wankel 4-rotor engine.

References

Sports prototypes
IMSA GTP cars